Willis Moody (August 28, 1898 – October, 1985) was an American Negro league outfielder in the 1920s.

A native of Clarksburg, West Virginia, Moody attended Kelly Miller High School. He made his Negro leagues debut in 1921 with the Pittsburgh Keystones, and went on to spend several seasons with the Homestead Grays. Moody died in 1985 at age 87.

References

External links
 and Baseball-Reference Black Baseball stats and Seamheads

1898 births
1985 deaths
Homestead Grays players
Pittsburgh Keystones players
Baseball outfielders
20th-century African-American sportspeople
Sportspeople from Clarksburg, West Virginia